Hamiora Tumutara Te Tihi-o-te-whenua Pio (1814–1901) was a New Zealand Māori tohunga and historian. Of Māori descent, he identified with the Ngati Awa and Ngati Tuwharetoa iwi. He was born in New Zealand in 1814.

References

1814 births
1901 deaths
New Zealand Māori writers
19th-century New Zealand historians
Tohunga
Ngāti Awa people
Ngāti Tūwharetoa people